Denys Rudolfovych Hotfrid (also transliterated Gotfrid, born 5 February 1975 in Magnitogorsk, Chelyabinsk Oblast) is a retired male weightlifter from Ukraine. He twice competed for his native country at the Summer Olympics: 1996 and 2000. Hotfrid is best known for winning a bronze medal at the 1996 Summer Olympics in the – 99 kg division, and setting a world record in clean & jerk (235 kg) on 1999-11-28 at the 1999 World Weightlifting Championships.

References

External links
 
 
 
 

1975 births
Living people
Ukrainian people of Russian descent
Ukrainian people of German descent
Ukrainian male weightlifters
Olympic weightlifters of Ukraine
Weightlifters at the 1996 Summer Olympics
Weightlifters at the 2000 Summer Olympics
Olympic bronze medalists for Ukraine
People from Magnitogorsk
Olympic medalists in weightlifting
Medalists at the 1996 Summer Olympics
European Weightlifting Championships medalists
World Weightlifting Championships medalists